In military terminology, a soft-skinned vehicle is any vehicle that is not armored, such as a truck, motorcycle, Jeep or car. The term soft-skinned vehicle may apply also to half-tracks and scouting vehicles having little or no armor. These can be used as general-purpose workhorses, like a 53-seater coach or pick-up, a military police vehicle, or a car used for undercover work on the home front.

References